The Azad Jammu and Kashmir Council or AJK Council (Urdu: آزاد جموں و کشمیر کونسل) is a supreme legislative and executive body of the Government of Azad Jammu and Kashmir which works under the federal Government of Pakistan. This governing body has more constitutional, executive, financial, legal, and administrative powers than the Legislative Assembly of Azad Jammu and Kashmir.

The Azad Jammu and Kashmir Council is chaired by the Prime Minister of Pakistan and has a total of 14 members as per the 1974 Interim Constitution of Azad Jammu and Kashmir. As the AJK Council works under the federal government of Pakistan, it serves as a bridge between the Government of Pakistan and the Government of Azad Jammu and Kashmir.

History 
The Azad Jammu and Kashmir Council was constituted under the Interim Constitution of Azad Jammu and Kashmir 1974 in August, 1974. Regarding the areas and subjects listed in sub-Article (3) of Article 31 of the interim constitution of AJK 1974, and the obligations placed on the Government of Pakistan by the United Nations Commission for India and Pakistan (UNCIP) resolutions, the Council shall serve as an advising body.

Organogram 
According the AJK interim constitution, the council will be consisting of;

 Prime Minister of Pakistan.
 President of Azad Jammu and Kashmir.
 Prime Minister of Azad Jammu and Kashmir or a person nominated by him.
 Five members to be nominated by the Prime Minister of Pakistan (amongst Federal Minister, MNA, and Senators).
 Six members to be elected by the AJK Legislative Assembly (amongst state subject/domicile holders in accordance with the system of proportional representation by means of the single transferable vote).

Qualifications 
The qualifications of the members of the AJK council will be based on the following;

 Must be a Member of National Assembly of Pakistan or a Member of Parliament of the Senate of Pakistan.
 Must be nominated by the Prime Minister of Azad Jammu and Kashmir.
 Must be a member of the AJK Legislative Assembly or be a AJK state subject/domicile holder.

Disqualification 
The disqualification of the members of the AJK council will be based on the following;

 If he misses thirty consecutive council meetings without the chairman's permission.
 If he misses the opportunity to take the oath required by sub-article 6 of the interim constitution of AJK 1974, within ninety days of the election date.
 If he no longer meets the requirements to be a member under the constitution or any other legislation.

Term 
An elected official of the AJK council has a five-year term that begins on the day they take office, with the exception that an elected member shall, upon the conclusion of his tenure, continue in office until his replacement approaches his office.

Current composition

See also 

 Ministry of Kashmir Affairs & Gilgit Baltistan
 Gilgit-Baltistan Council
 Government of Azad Kashmir

References

External links 
Official website

Government of Azad Kashmir
1974 establishments in Pakistan
Government agencies established in 1974